Itoa orientalis is a species of flowering plants belonging to the family Salicaceae.
An evergreen tree from China and Vietnam, and cultivated as an ornamental tree.

Description
It has branchlets (small branches) that are covered with yellowish hairs when young and later become glabrous and lenticellate (havings lens-like areas on the surface). They are elliptic to obovate or broad-lanceolate in shape. With the upper surface of the leaf, largely glabrous and the lower surface with stiff hairs, particularly on the veins. The leaves have 10–26 secondary veins on each side of the midrib, with margins almost entire to regularly crenate or serrate and an apex that is acute or emarginate. It begins blossoming between May to June, with clusters of curious yellow buff flowers. The staminate (male flower, flower with stamens but no pistil) inflorescences are paniculate (male flower, flower with stamens but no pistil), about 5 cm long with about 12 flowers. The axes (stems) are pubescent (covered with short, soft hairs). The staminate flowers are ribbed and densely tomentose (covered in matted hairs) in bud. The pistillate flowers are small and solitary. It begins fruiting (making a seed capsule) between September to October. The fruiting peduncle (flower stalk) is robust. The seeds are small, with a wing up to 2 cm wide.

Taxonomy
The genus name of Itoa is in honour of Keisuke Itō (1803–1901) a Japanese physician and biologist, and his grandson Tokutarō Itō (1868–1941), and the Latin specific epithet of orientalis means coming from the Orient or the east.
It was first described and published in Hooker's Icon. Pl. Vol.27 on table 2688 in 1901.

Range and habitat
It is found in broadleaf evergreen forests, in south-eastern China, (including Hainan island and provinces of Guizhou, Sichuan and Yunnan) and Vietnam.

Uses
It is grown as an ornamental tree in Australia, Cornwall, UK, and Ireland.

References

Salicaceae
Plants described in 1845
Flora of China
Flora of Vietnam